The Folk Research Centre (FRC, Plas Wíchès Foklò) of Saint Lucia has studied and promoted the local music of Saint Lucia since its foundation in 1973. 

Since 1990, it has published a journal called Lucian Kaiso.

References

External links
Official site

Organisations based in Saint Lucia